The 1984 season of the Paraguayan Primera División, the top category of Paraguayan football, was played by 10 teams. The national champions were Guaraní.

Results

First stage

First-place play-off

Second stage

Third stage

Group A

Group B

Final Stage
 Teams started with the following "bonus" points: Guaraní with 3 bonus points, Olimpia with 4 bonus points, Cerro Porteño and Libertad with 1 bonus point.

External links
Paraguay 1984 season at RSSSF

Para
Paraguayan Primera División seasons
1